Harald Sunde (born 21 February 1944) is a Norwegian former football player and coach. He played for Rosenborg BK in Trondheim in three periods from 1967 to 1979, in seven seasons in the Norwegian Premier League he played 104 matches and scored 30 goals. Sunde was capped 39 times for Norway national football team and scored five goals.
Sunde coached Rosenborg BK in parts of the 1983 season.

Biography
Harald Sunde started his football career in Nidelv IL in Trondheim, which in the early sixties was one of the best clubs in the city. Sunde was capped for Norway junior team in 1961 and for Norway u-21 in 1963 and the Norway national football team in 1964. When Rosenborg BK in 1967 was promoted to the top division Sunde transferred to Rosenborg BK. In Rosenborg Sunde was striker together with  Odd Iversen, the 1967 season was successful with league gold medals.  1968 Rosenborg came second, and earned gold medals again in 1969.

In 1970 Sunde and Iversen were both sold to Racing Mechelen in Belgium. Sunde returned to Rosenborg in 1972.

In 1975 Sunde became playing coach for Orkanger IF, and he returned to Rosenborg in 1978 when Rosenborg was in the second division. Nils Arne Eggen had taken over the role as head coach and Rosenborg managed to return to the top division after one season in the second division.  In his last season 1979 Sunde played five league matches. In the eighties Sunde had different coaching roles in Rosenborg, amongst these a period as head coach in 1983.

Honours
Rosenborg BK
Norwegian Premier League champion: 1967, 1969
Norwegian Premier League runner-up: 1968, 1973
Norwegian Cup runner-up 1967, 1973

References

External links
 

Expatriate footballers in Belgium
Norway international footballers
Norwegian expatriate footballers
Norwegian football managers
Eliteserien players
Norwegian footballers
Footballers from Trondheim
Rosenborg BK managers
Rosenborg BK players
K.R.C. Mechelen players
1944 births
Living people
Norwegian expatriate sportspeople in Belgium
Association football forwards
Association football midfielders